

Paleontologists
 Death of Georges Cuvier.

References

1830s in paleontology
Paleontology